This is a list of Bengali films produced by the West Bengal film industry and the Bangladeshi film industry in 2002.

Highest-grossing
 Sathi

Bangladeshi films

West Bengal films

References

External links
 Bengali films of 2002 at the Internet Movie Database

2002
Lists of 2002 films by country or language
2002 in Indian cinema